Otto Beck (30 March 1846 – 19 May 1908) was a German politician, and former senior mayor for Mannheim from 1891 to 1908. Moreover, by having founded the Handelshochschule Mannheim together with Heinrich Gothein in 1907, he is regarded as one of the founding fathers of the University of Mannheim.

Education
Beck was born in Krautheim, Baden-Württemberg, Germany. He studied law at the Heidelberg University until 1871, where he obtained his Staatsexamen (equivalent to Juris Doctor). Later in his life, Beck received an Honorary doctor from his alma mater.

Live

Later, Beck, together with  Heidelberg's economics professor Eberhard Gothein (1853–1923), initiated the foundation of the Handelshochschule Mannheim to revive academic education in Mannheim.

Literature
 
 Engelbert Strobel: Oberbürgermeister Otto Julius Beck. In: Badische Heimat 1982, Heft 2. Karlsruhe 1982
 Stadt Mannheim, Michael Caroli, Ulrich Nieß (Hg.): Geschichte der Stadt Mannheim: Bd 2 1801–1914. Ubstadt-Weiher 2007,

See also
 Mannheim
 List of University of Mannheim people
 University of Mannheim
 Heidelberg University

Notes

External links
 Mannheim's official Website

1846 births
1908 deaths
German politicians